Brogborough is a village and civil parish in the Central Bedfordshire district of Bedfordshire, England, by junction 13 of the M1 motorway. According to the 2001, census it had a population of 343, reducing to 302 at the 2011 Census.

Brogborough Lake
Home to the Brogborough Windsurfing Club, the  lake is solely dedicated to Windsurfing and Stand up paddle surfing.

Grand Union Canal branch

There is a proposal to create a new branch of the Grand Union Canal between Milton Keynes and Bedford.  The terrain is broadly favourable for most of the route, but Brogborough Hill creates a formidable obstacle.

Options being considered include a tunnel under the hill, or a Falkirk Wheel or the Brogborough Whirl plan to go over it.

References

https://web.archive.org/web/20110608073009/http://www.b-mkwaterway.co.uk/documents/Brogborough_Whirl.pdf

External links

Villages in Bedfordshire
Civil parishes in Bedfordshire
Central Bedfordshire District